The 1943 Birmingham Aston by-election was held on 9 June 1943.  The byelection was held due to the death during World War II of the incumbent Conservative MP, Edward Kellett.  It was won by the Conservative candidate Redvers Prior.

References

1943 in England
1943 elections in the United Kingdom
Aston, 1943
1940s in Birmingham, West Midlands